Paulo Emilio may refer to:

 Paulo Emilio (footballer, born 1936) (1936–2016), Brazilian football manager and former footballer
 Paulo Emilio (footballer, born 1972), Brazilian footballer